The Times Square Ball is a time ball located in New York City's Times Square. Located on the roof of One Times Square, the ball is a prominent part of a New Year's Eve celebration in Times Square commonly referred to as the ball drop, where the ball descends down a specially designed flagpole, beginning at 11:59:00 p.m. ET, and resting at midnight to signal the start of the new year. In recent years, the ball drop has been preceded by live entertainment, including performances by musicians.

The event was first organized by Adolph Ochs, owner of The New York Times newspaper, as a successor to a series of New Year's Eve fireworks displays he held at the building to promote its status as the new headquarters of the Times, while the ball itself was designed by Artkraft Strauss. First held on December 31, 1907, to welcome 1908, the ball drop has been held annually since, except in 1942 and 1943 in observance of wartime blackouts.

Since 1999–2000, the ball has featured an outer surface consisting of triangular panels manufactured by Waterford Crystal, which contain inscriptions representing a yearly theme.

The event is organized by the Times Square Alliance and Countdown Entertainment, a company led by Jeff Strauss. Since 2009, the ball has been displayed atop One Times Square nearly year-round, while the original, smaller version of the current ball that was used in 2008 has been on display inside the Times Square visitor's center. The prevalence of the Times Square ball drop has inspired similar "drops" at other local New Year's Eve events across the country; while some use balls, some instead drop objects that represent local culture or history.

Events

Event organization

To facilitate the arrival of attendees, Times Square is closed to traffic beginning in the late afternoon on New Year's Eve. The square is then divided into different viewing sections referred to as "pens", into which attendees are directed sequentially upon arrival. Security is strictly enforced by the New York City Police Department (NYPD), even more so since the 2001–02 edition in the wake of the September 11 attacks. Attendees are required to pass through security checkpoints before they are assigned a pen, and are prohibited from bringing backpacks or alcohol to the event.

Security was increased further for its 2017–18 edition due to recent incidents such as the truck attack in New York on October 31, and the 2017 Las Vegas shooting; these included additional patrols of Times Square hotels, rooftop patrol squads and counter-snipers, and the installation of reflective markers on buildings to help officers identify the location of elevated shooters. For 2018–19, the NYPD announced its intent to use a camera-equipped quadcopter to augment the over 1,200 fixed cameras monitoring Times Square, but it was left grounded due to inclement weather.

Festivities
Festivities formally begin in the early evening, with an opening ceremony featuring the raising of the ball at 6:00 p.m. ET along with the playing of Fanfare for the Common Man by The New York Philharmonic. Party favors are distributed to attendees, which have historically included large balloons, hats, and other items branded with the event's corporate sponsors. The lead-up to midnight features a program of entertainment, including musical performances: some of these performances are organized by, and aired by New Year's Eve television specials broadcasting from Times Square.

The climax of the festivities is the drop itself, which begins at 11:59:00 p.m. ET. Officially, the drop is activated using a button inside a special control room within One Times Square, synchronized using an National Institute of Standards and Technology (NIST) time signal received via satellite. Since 1996, the drop has been ceremonially "activated" on-stage by one or more special guests, joined by the current mayor of New York City, by pressing a button on a smaller model of the ball. The guests are selected annually to recognize their community involvement or significance, and have included:
 1996–97: Oseola McCarty
 1997–98: A group of five winners from a school essay contest honoring New York City's centennial
 1998–99: Sang Lan (who was injured during the 1998 Goodwill Games and was being rehabilitated in New York City)
 1999–2000: Mary Ann Hopkins from Doctors Without Borders
 2000–01: Muhammad Ali
 2001–02: Judith Giuliani; Ex-wife of Rudy Giuliani. this was Giuliani's final act as mayor. Michael Bloomberg officially became the new Mayor of New York City upon the beginning of 2002, and took his oath of office shortly after midnight.
 2002–03: Christopher Reeve and Dana Reeve
 2003–04: Cyndi Lauper, joined by Shoshana Johnson—the first black female prisoner of war in the military history of the United States.
 2004–05: United States Secretary of State Colin Powell
 2005–06: Wynton Marsalis
 2006–07: A group of ten United States Armed Forces members
 2007–08: Karolina Wierzchowska, an Iraq War veteran and New York City Police Academy valedictorian
 2008–09: Bill Clinton and Hillary Clinton
 2009–10: Twelve students from New York City high schools on the Gold Medal List of the U.S. News & World Reports "America's Best High Schools".
 2010–11: Former Staff sergeant Salvatore Giunta
 2011–12: Lady Gaga
 2012–13: The Rockettes
 2013–14: Associate Justice of the Supreme Court of the United States Sonia Sotomayor.
 2014–15: Jencarlos Canela, joined by a group of refugees who emigrated to New York City, in partnership with the International Rescue Committee
 2015–16: Humanitarian Hugh Evans
 2016–17: United Nations Secretary-General Ban Ki-moon; this was Ban's final act as UN Secretary-General, as António Guterres took office on January 1, 2017.
 2017–18: Tarana Burke, civil rights activist and founder of the #MeToo movement.
 2018–19: Joel Simon—Executive Director of the Committee to Protect Journalists, and a group of eleven journalists: Karen Attiah, Rebecca Blumenstein, Alisyn Camerota, Vladimir Duthiers, Edward Felsenthal, Lester Holt, Matt Murray, Martha Raddatz, Maria Ressa, Jon Scott, and Karen Toulon.
 2019–20: New York City high school teachers Jared Fox and Aida Rosenbaum —recipients of the 11th annual Sloan Awards for Excellence in Teaching Science and Mathematics, and four of their students.
 2020–21: Chirlane McCray, wife of Mayor Bill de Blasio.
 2021–22: Michael James Scott, Mary Claire King, and Ben Crawford. Due to social distancing measures, the guests did not press the button with the mayor. The event was de Blasio's final act as mayor of New York City. Mayor-elect Eric Adams took his oath of office shortly after midnight.
 2022–23: Eric Adams
 2023–24 TBA
The conclusion of the drop is followed by fireworks shot from the roof of One Times Square, along with the playing of the first verse of "Auld Lang Syne" by Guy Lombardo, "Theme from New York, New York" by Frank Sinatra, "America the Beautiful" by Ray Charles, "What a Wonderful World" by Louis Armstrong, and "Somewhere Over the Rainbow/What a Wonderful World" by Israel Kamakawiwo'ole.

Since the 2005–06 edition of the event, the drop has been directly preceded by the playing of John Lennon's song "Imagine" at 11:55 p.m. Until 2009–2010, the original recording was used; since 2010–2011, the song has been performed by the headlining artist;
 2010–11: Taio Cruz
 2011–12: CeeLo Green
 2012–13: Train
 2013–14: Melissa Etheridge
 2014–15: O.A.R.
 2015–16: Jessie J
 2016–17: Rachel Platten
 2017–18: Andy Grammer
 2018–19: Bebe Rexha
 2019–20: X Ambassadors
 2020–21: Andra Day
 2021–22: KT Tunstall
 2022–23: Chelsea Cutler
 2023–24 TBA
At least  of confetti is dropped in Times Square, directed by Treb Heining (who has been well known for his involvement in designing balloon decorations for Disney Parks, and balloon and confetti drops at other major U.S. events and celebrations, such as the presidential nominating conventions) and thrown by a team of 100 volunteers (referred to internally as "confetti dispersal engineers") lining the rooftops of eight Times Square buildings at 11:59:40 p.m. The individual pieces of confetti are meant to be larger than normal confetti in order to achieve an appropriate density for the environment. Some of the pieces are inscribed with messages of hope for the new year, which are submitted via a "Wishing Wall" put up in Times Square in December (where visitors can write them directly on individual pieces of confetti), and via online submissions.

Cleanup

After the conclusion of the festivities and the dispersal of attendees, cleanup is performed overnight to remove confetti and other debris from Times Square. When it is re-opened to the public the following morning, few traces of the previous night's celebration remain: following the 2013–14 drop, the New York City Department of Sanitation estimated that it had cleared over 50 tons of refuse from Times Square in eight hours, using 190 workers from their own crews and the Times Square Alliance.

History

Early celebrations, first and second balls (1904–1955) 
The first New Year's Eve celebration in Times Square was held on December 31, 1904; The New York Times owner, Adolph Ochs, decided to celebrate the opening of the newspaper's new headquarters, One Times Square, with a New Year's fireworks show on the southern roof of the building to welcome 1905. Close to 200,000 people attended the event, displacing traditional celebrations that had normally been held at Trinity Church. However, following several years of fireworks shows, Ochs wanted a bigger spectacle at the building to draw more attention to the area. The newspaper's chief electrician, Walter F. Palmer, suggested using a time ball, after seeing one used on the Western Union Telegraph Building, near Trinity Church.

The ball was hoisted on the building's 70 foot flagpole with rope by a team of six men. The ball would begin to drop at 10 seconds before midnight. Once it hit the roof, the ball completed a circuit that lit 5-foot-tall signs on the sides of the building to signal the new year, and triggered a fireworks show. The first ever "ball drop" was held on December 31, 1907, welcoming the year 1908.

In 1913, only eight years after it moved to One Times Square, the Times moved its corporate headquarters to 229 West 43rd Street. The Times still maintained ownership of the tower, however, and Strauss continued to organize future editions of the drop.

The ball drop was placed on hiatus for New Year's Eve 1942–43 and 1943–44 due to wartime lighting restrictions during World War II. Instead, a moment of silence was observed one minute before midnight in Times Square, followed by the sound of church bells being played from sound trucks.

The third ball (1955–1998) 

It was not until 1979 that it became an established practice for the crowd in Times Square to count down the final seconds during the event—a practice that only became common in general on New Year's Eve television specials in the 1960s.

For the 1981-82 event, the ball was modified to make it resemble an apple with red bulbs and a green "stem", alluding to New York's nickname, "the Big Apple" for the “I Love New York” marketing campaign. For the 1987-88 event, organizers acknowledged the addition of a leap second earlier that day by extending the drop to 61 seconds, and including a special one-second light show at 12:00:01 a.m. (leap seconds are appended at midnight UTC, which is five hours before midnight in New York). The original white bulbs returned to the ball for the 1988-89 event, but were replaced by red, white, and blue bulbs for the 1990-91 event to salute the troops of Operation Desert Shield.

The third ball was updated again for the 1995–96 event, adding a computerized lighting system with 180 halogen bulbs and 144 strobe lights, and over 12,000 rhinestones. Lighting designer Barry Arnold stated that the changes were "something [that] had to be done to make this event more spectacular as we approach the millennium."

The drop itself became computerized through the use of an electric winch synchronized with the National Institute of Standards and Technology's time signal; the first drop with the new system was not without issues, however, as a glitch caused the ball to pause for a short moment halfway through its descent. The following year, John Trowbridge was hired as the drop's new technical director; in 2021, Jeff Strauss told The Wall Street Journal that the drop has never had any technical issues since.

After its 44th use in 1999, the third ball was retired and placed on display at the Atlanta headquarters of Jamestown Group, owners of One Times Square.

Into the new millennium, the fourth ball (1999–2007) 

On December 28, 1998, during a press conference attended by New York City mayor Rudy Giuliani, organizers announced that the third ball would be retired for the arrival of the new millennium, and replaced by a new design constructed by Waterford Crystal. The year 2000 celebrations introduced more prominent sponsorship to the event; companies such as Discover Card, Korbel Champagne, and Panasonic were announced as official sponsors of the festivities in Times Square. The city also announced that Ron Silver would lead a committee known as "NYC 2000", which was in charge of organizing events across the city for year 2000 celebrations.

A full day of festivities was held at Times Square to celebrate the arrival of the year 2000, which included concerts and hourly cultural presentations with parades of puppets designed by Michael Curry, representing countries entering the new year at that hour. Organizers expected a total attendance exceeding two million spectators.

The ball was constructed at Waterford's factory in Ireland, and was then shipped to New York City, where the lighting system and motorized mirrors were installed. Many of the panels were inscribed with "Hope"-themed designs changing yearly, which included "Star of Hope", "Hope for Abundance", "Hope for Healing", "Hope for Courage", "Hope for Unity", "Hope for Wisdom", "Hope for Fellowship", and "Hope for Peace".

The 2002 theme "Hope for Healing" was in commemoration of the September 11 terrorist attacks, which had occurred three and a half months earlier. 195 of the ball's panels were engraved with the names of countries and emergency organizations that had taken casualties during the attacks, and the names of the World Trade Center, The Pentagon, and the four flights that were involved in the attacks. In December 2011, the "Hope for Healing" panels were accepted into the permanent collection of the National September 11 Memorial & Museum.

The fifth ball (2008–present) 
To mark the 100th anniversary of the first ball drop, a new fifth design debuted for the 2007–08 event. Organizers stated that the new ball was also more energy-efficient, and consumed an equivalent amount of electricity to 10 toasters.

It contains 2,688 panels, and is lit by 32,256 LED lamps. The new ball was designed to be weatherproof, as it would now be displayed atop One Times Square nearly year-round following the celebrations. The 2008 ball was placed on display at the Times Square Visitors Center.

Yearly themes for the ball's crystal panels continued; from 2008 to 2013, the ball contained crystal patterns that were part of a Waterford series known as "World of Celebration", which included "Let There Be Light", "Let There Be Joy", "Let There Be Courage", "Let There Be Love", "Let There Be Friendship", and "Let There Be Peace". For 2014, all the ball's panels were replaced, marking a new theme series known as "Greatest Gifts", beginning with "Gift of Imagination". “

The numerical sign indicating the year (which remains atop the tower along with the ball itself) uses Philips LED lamps. The "14" digits for 2014 used Philips Hue multi-color LED lamps, allowing them to have computerized lighting cues.

Modifications due to the COVID-19 pandemic 
Due to the COVID-19 pandemic in New York City, the 2020–21 festivities were closed to the general public. Attendance was largely limited to the invited families of first responders and other essential workers from the New York City area (billed as "The Heroes of 2020"), along with performers and members of the media. In accordance with New York state health orders, face masks were mandatory, and households were placed within  "pens" with social distancing. There was an estimated 80% reduction in NYPD presence at the event in comparison to past years.

The VNYE app was released as a digital companion to the event, featuring augmented reality camera filters and a digital recreation of Times Square as a virtual world where users could play minigames, view live streams of New Year's festivities in New York City and elsewhere, and witness a virtual version of the ball drop. 

For the 2021–22 festivities, public attendance was reinstated, but all attendees over the age of 5 were required to present proof of vaccination for COVID-19 and wear a face mask. If covered by a specific exemption, attendees were alternatively allowed to present proof of a recent negative PCR test from within the past 72 hours. Although Mayor Bill de Blasio originally announced plans for the event to otherwise be held as normal with no restrictions on capacity, the official maximum capacity was ultimately reduced to 15,000 people instead of the usual 58,000. 

Due to a COVID-19 infection, the technical director of the 2021–22 event did not operate the ball drop in-person, but instead directed the event quarantined at a hotel in New Jersey. The Fox network also canceled its planned New Year's Eve special from Times Square, citing COVID-19 concerns.

Weather at midnight 
According to National Weather Service records, since 1907–08, the average temperature in nearby Central Park during the ball drop has been . Snow has fallen seven times, with the earliest being the 1926–27 event, and the most recent being the 2009–10 event, and rain/drizzle has fallen seventeen times, with the earliest being the 1918–19 event, and the most recent being the 2022–23 event.

Broadcasting

As a public event, the festivities and ball drop are often broadcast on television. A host pool feed is provided to broadcasters for use in coverage, which for 2016–17 consisted of 21 cameras. Since 2009–10, an official webcast of the ball drop and its associated festivities has been produced, streamed via Livestream.com.

The event is covered as part of New Year's Eve television specials on several major U.S. television networks, which usually intersperse on-location coverage from Times Square with entertainment segments, such as musical performances (some of which held live in Times Square as part of the event). By far the most notable of these is Dick Clark's New Year's Rockin' Eve; created, produced, and originally hosted by the entertainer Dick Clark until his death in 2012 (with Regis Philbin filling in for its 2004–05 broadcast), and currently hosted by Ryan Seacrest, the program first aired on NBC in 1972 before moving to ABC, where it has been broadcast ever since. New Year's Rockin' Eve has consistently been the most-watched New Year's Eve special in the U.S. annually, peaking at 25.6 million viewers for its 2017–18 edition. Following the death of Dick Clark in April 2012, a crystal engraved with his name was added to the 2013 ball in tribute.

Across the remaining networks, CBS broadcasts New Year's Eve Live: Nashville's Big Bash, which began Times Square midnight coverage for its 2022–23 broadcast. Spanish-language network Univision broadcasts ¡Feliz!, hosted by Raúl de Molina of El Gordo y La Flaca. On cable, CNN carries coverage of the festivities, known as New Year's Eve Live, currently hosted by Anderson Cooper and Andy Cohen (the latter first replacing Kathy Griffin for 2018). Fox News carries All-American New Year, which was most recently hosted by the panel of Fox & Friends Weekend.

Past broadcasts 
Beginning in the 1940s, NBC broadcast coverage from Times Square anchored by Ben Grauer on both radio and television. Its coverage was later incorporated into special episodes of The Tonight Show, continuing through Johnny Carson and Jay Leno's tenures on the program. NBC would later introduce a dedicated special, New Year's Eve with Carson Daly (later renamed NBC's New Year's Eve), hosted by former MTV personality Carson Daly, which first began midnight coverage in 2006, and was discontinued in 2022 in favor of a new special hosted from Miami by Miley Cyrus called Miley’s New Year’s Eve Party.

From 1956 to 1976, CBS televised Guy Lombardo's annual New Year's Eve concert with his big band The Royal Canadians, most frequently from the Waldorf-Astoria's ballroom. It featured coverage from Times Square, and the band's signature rendition of "Auld Lang Syne" at midnight. After Lombardo's death in 1977, the special continued with Guy's younger brother Victor Lombardo as host and bandleader, but increasing competition from New Year’s Rockin’ Eve prompted CBS to replace it for 1979–80 with Happy New Year, America. The new special ran in various formats with different hosts (such as Paul Anka, Donny Osmond, Andy Williams, Late Show bandleader Paul Shaffer, and talk show host Montel Williams) until it was discontinued after 1996. Besides coverage during a special episode of Late Show with David Letterman for 1999, and America's Millennium for 2000, CBS would not air any national New Year's Eve specials again until 2021–22, when it first aired New Year's Eve Live: Nashville's Big Bash.

Beginning in 1991, Fox occasionally broadcast its New Year's specials from Times Square, though some years did however have different specials that focused on festivities in other cities (such as Las Vegas and Miami). Fox New Year's Eve Live was the special that aired the most often on the network, being broadcast from 1991 to 1993, and then again from 2002 to 2013. Fox would later introduce a new Times Square-based special in 2017, hosted by Steve Harvey, which lasted until 2019. For 2020–21, Fox aired New Year's Eve Toast & Roast, hosted by Ken Jeong and  Joel McHale from Los Angeles, with Kelly Osbourne reporting from Times Square. Fox intended for the special to return for 2021–22, however it was cancelled due to public health concerns in New York City. The following year, Fox did without any New Year's Eve programming altogether.

For 2000, in lieu of New Year's Rockin' Eve, ABC News covered the festivities as part of its day-long telecast, ABC 2000 Today. Hosted by then-chief correspondent Peter Jennings, the broadcast featured coverage of New Year's festivities from around the world as part of an international consortium. Dick Clark would join Jennings to co-anchor coverage from Times Square.

MTV had broadcast coverage originating from the network's Times Square studios at One Astor Plaza. For 2011, MTV also held its own ball drop in Seaside Heights, New Jersey, the setting of its popular reality series Jersey Shore, featuring cast member Snooki lowered inside a giant "hamster ball". Originally, MTV planned to hold the drop within its studio in Times Square, but the network was asked by city officials to conduct the drop elsewhere.

For 2019, prominent video game streamer Ninja hosted a 12-hour New Year's Eve stream on Twitch from Times Square, featuring matches of Fortnite Battle Royale with himself and special guests from a studio in the Paramount Building. Ninja made an on-stage appearance in Times Square during the festivities outside, which included a failed attempt to lead the crowd in a floss dance (a routine made popular by Fortnite).

Technical difficulties
Times Square Ball and other components of the annual event have sometimes experienced technical difficulties. These include the following:
 1949–50: A fuse blows.
 1953–54: A windstorm caused the ball to push back up.
 1954–55: The ball got tangled up and took a while to get untangled.
 1955–56: Error in the electric lighting for the ball lights to turn off at 11:59:58 and caused the 1956 numerals to light up at 12:15 AM.
 1977–78: 1978 numerals light up at 11:59:57 due to ball dropping way too fast when it was 10 seconds.
 1980–81: (New Year's Rockin' Eve only) The clock shows 11:60 instead of 12:00.
 1995–96: A glitch occurred where the new computerized lowering caused a malfunction in the descent, displaying midnight two seconds later than real-time.
 2002–03: Countdown screen turns off at 11:59:20.
 2004–05: Countdown is too fast; 2005 numerals light up at correct time. Surround sound system malfunctions shortly after midnight, causing Auld Lang Syne to begin late.
 2005–06: 2006 Numerals turn off seven seconds after midnight, then turn on again a few seconds later. Low wind and extremely humid conditions, in conjunction with many fireworks, generated a lot of smoke, blocking One Times Square, the first of currently five times this has happened; with the same happening in 2009–10, 2018–19, 2021–22 and 2022–23.
 2007–08: 2008 numerals light up early.
 2009–10: Countdown glitches at 11:59:04. The weather conditions that night: light snowfall, no wind and very cold, in conjunction with lots of powerful fireworks, generated heavy smoke, which blocked the building for about a minute and a half.
 2014–15: During the countdown, no fireworks were launched.
 2016–17: Fireworks on top-right never launched.
 2018–19: Heavy rain caused the fireworks to become smoke, causing the countdown and the 2019 numerals to be poorly visible at the stroke of midnight.
 2021–22: The extremely humid environment (as if it had rained) and light wind, with a bunch of fireworks, generated an excessive accumulation of smoke, completely blocking visibility to the main building seconds after the arrival of 2022.
 2022–23: Auld lang syne is played early. The rain caused the fireworks to became smoke, and 1 and half minute after, the building was blocked by the smoke again, though not quite to the degree as the previous year.

See also
 List of objects dropped on New Year's Eve

Notes

References

External links

 
 New Year's Eve on the Times Square Alliance website

1907 establishments in New York City
Culture of New York City
December events
Festivals established in 1907
New Year in the United States
Recurring events established in 1907
Ball
Winter traditions